The Final Tour is a 1998 live album from American soul blues singer Ted Hawkins released posthumously through Evidence Music on January 1, 1998. The recordings capture Hawkins on his last concert tour in 1994, weeks before his death. The album received mixed and positive reviews.

Recording
The first 16 tracks formed a set at McCabe's Guitar Shop in Santa Monica, California, on November 5, 1994. The next three songs formed a suite about Hawkins' life growing up in Mississippi, recorded on October 8, 1994, at The Pres House at the University of Wisconsin–Madison. Finally, "A Thing Called Love" was performed at Goochi's, in Wenatchee, Washington.

Critical reception

Alex Henderson of AllMusic gave the album 4.5 out of five stars, saying that it "shows how great Hawkins was sounding during the last months of his life" and summing it up as magnificent. Rock critic Robert Christgau gave the album a more muted review, giving it an honorable mention.

Track listing
All songs written by Ted Hawkins unless otherwise stated

Intro – 0:24 (a spoken-word introduction by Hawkins)
"There Stands the Glass" (Russ Hull, Webb Pierce, Mary Jean Shurtz) – 2:49
"Watch Your Step" – 2:44
"Strange Conversation" – 5:16
"Sorry You're Sick" – 2:18
"Bring It on Home Daddy" – 3:16
"Big Things" – 3:02
"Revenge of Scorpio" – 2:56
"Groovy Little Things" – 3:41
"Ladder of Success" – 3:13
"Part Time Love" (Clay Hammond) – 5:24
"I Got What I Wanted" (Brook Benton, Margie Singleton) – 3:07
"Bad Dog"" – 2:24
"The Good and the Bad" – 4:56
"All I Have to Offer You Is Me" (Dallas Frazier, A.L. Owens) – 4:23
"Long as I Can See the Light" (John Fogerty) – 2:44 		
"Biloxi" (Jesse Winchester) – 4:17
"The Lost Ones" – 3:16 		
"Missin' Mississippi" (Byron Gallimore, Alan Mevis, William Shore) – 3:57
"A Thing Called Love" (Jerry Reed) – 2:53

Personnel
Ted Hawkins – acoustic guitar, vocals
Phil Garfinkel – engineering
Jerry Gordon – production
Wayne Griffith – engineering
Bill Wasserzieher – liner notes

References

1998 live albums
Evidence Music live albums
Live albums published posthumously
Ted Hawkins albums